Birine is a town and commune in Djelfa Province, Algeria. According to the 2008 census it has a population of 26,670.

References

Communes of Djelfa Province